Muhammad Ferris Danial Bin Mat Nasir (born 21 August 1992) is a Malaysian professional footballer who plays as a forward.

Club career

Harimau Muda
He start his senior career with Harimau Muda from 2010 to 2014 under coach Ong Kim Swee.

Felda United
On 12 December 2014, Ferris was announced as a Felda United new signing, after being released from Harimau Muda.

Initially Ferris was in a contract dispute between his hometown team Kelantan and Felda United, and was only resolved in March 2015 by mutual agreement between both teams. This caused him to miss the first three months of the season, finally making his debut with Felda United, as a substitute, on 8 March 2015 against LionsXII in a league match.

Terengganu
In November 2016, Ferris left Felda United to signed with Terengganu.

Career statistics

Club statistics

Honours

Club
Melaka United
 Malaysia Premier League: 2016

References

External links
 
1992 births
Living people
Malaysian people of Malay descent
People from Kelantan
Malaysian footballers
Felda United F.C. players
Negeri Sembilan FC players
Malaysia Super League players
Association football forwards
Footballers at the 2014 Asian Games
Melaka United F.C. players
Terengganu FC players
Perak F.C. players
Asian Games competitors for Malaysia